The men's long jump at the 2017 World Para Athletics Championships was held at the Olympic Stadium in London from 14 to 23 July.

Medalists

Events listed in pink were contested but no medals were awarded.

Detailed results

T11

T12

T20

T38

See also
List of IPC world records in athletics

References

long jump
2017 in men's athletics
Long jump at the World Para Athletics Championships